LemonStand was a Canadian e-commerce company headquartered in Vancouver, British Columbia, that developed cloud-based computer software for online retailers. LemonStand was shut down on June 5th, 2019.

History
LemonStand Version 1 was launched on July 28, 2001. It is written in the PHP programming language.

Version 1 was released as an on-premises proprietary licensed software, and the commercial license was not free. However, there was a free trial license available.

June 2012, LemonStand raised seed funding from the BDC Venture Capital, and a group of angel investors.

Dec 20, 2013 a cloud-based SaaS version of the LemonStand eCommerce platform was released publicly.

May 9, 2014 LemonStand and Payfirma, a payments processing company, partnered to provide integrated services for online retailers.

May 3, 2016 LemonStand raised funding from BDC Venture Capital and Silicon Valley based angel investors.

March 5, 2019 LemonStand announced their intention to shut down on June 5th, 2019. LemonStand was quietly acquired by Mailchimp at the end of February.

Pricing
LemonStand offers three levels of service plans.  LemonStand does not charge any transaction fees.

See also
 Shopping cart software
 Comparison of shopping cart software

References

External links
 

Web applications